Leroy Sherrier Lewis (29 May 1945 – 13 September 2021) was a Costa Rican association football player and coach.

In his native country, he led his hometown team Limonense to their best performance in the top flight league, finishing as runners-up. He also found success in Belize, where he led the national team to their best result at the Copa Centroamericana, finishing four at the 2013 edition, thus qualifying to the 2013 CONCACAF Gold Cup, Belize's only participation at such tournament so far.

Playing career
As a player, he played in his native Costa Rica with AD Limonese and Uruguay de Coronado.

Coaching career
Lewis coached teams in Costa Rica and Belize, winning the national championships in Costa Rica and Belize with Guanacasteca (Segunda División de Costa Rica) and Belmopan Bandits (Belize Premier Football League) respectively. He also has coached Belize national football team on three occasions.

Death
Lewis died on 13 September 2021 at his home after battling with prostate cancer.

References

1945 births
2021 deaths
Costa Rican football managers
Costa Rican expatriate football managers
Costa Rican footballers
Costa Rican expatriate sportspeople in Belize
Belize national football team managers
Association footballers not categorized by position
People from Limón Province
Deaths from prostate cancer
Deaths from cancer in Costa Rica